The 2011–12 All-Ireland Junior Club Hurling Championship was the ninth staging of the All-Ireland Junior Club Hurling Championship since its establishment by the Gaelic Athletic Association. The championship ran from 25 September 2011 to 11 February 2012.

The All-Ireland final was played on 11 February 2012 at Croke Park in Dublin, between St. Patrick's, Ballyragget from Kilkenny and Charleville from Cork, in what was their first ever meeting in the final. St. Patrick's, Ballyraggett won the match by 1-13 to 1-12 to claim their first ever championship title.

St. Patrick's Ballyraggett's Kevin Kelly was the championship's top scorer with 0-32.

Connacht Junior Club Hurling Championship

Connacht semi-finals

Connacht final

Leinster Junior Club Hurling Championship

Leinster first round

Leinster quarter-finals

Leinster semi-finals

Leinster final

Munster Junior Club Hurling Championship

Munster quarter-final

Munster semi-finals

Munster final

Ulster Junior Club Hurling Championship

Ulster preliminary round

Ulster quarter-finals

Ulster semi-finals

Ulster final

All-Ireland Junior Club Hurling Championship

All-Ireland quarter-final

All-Ireland semi-finals

All-Ireland final

References

All-Ireland Junior Club Hurling Championship
All-Ireland Junior Club Hurling Championship
All-Ireland Junior Club Hurling Championship